MATE is a desktop environment composed of free and open-source software that runs on Linux, BSD, and illumos operating systems.

Name 
MATE is named after the South American plant yerba mate and tea made from the herb, mate. The name is stylized in all capital letters to follow the nomenclature of other Free Software desktop environments like KDE and LXDE. The recursive backronym "MATE Advanced Traditional Environment" was subsequently adopted by most of the MATE community, again in the spirit of Free Software like GNU ("GNU's Not Unix!"). The use of a new name, instead of GNOME, avoids naming conflicts with GNOME 3 components.

History 
An Argentine user of Arch Linux, named Perberos started the MATE project to fork and continue GNOME 2 in response to the negative reception of GNOME 3, which had replaced its traditional taskbar (GNOME Panel) with GNOME Shell. MATE aims to maintain and continue the latest GNOME 2 code base, frameworks, and core applications.

MATE was initially announced for Debian on November 8, 2013, at its official website.

MATE became an official Arch Linux community package in January 2014.

Component applications 

MATE has forked a number of applications which originated as GNOME Core Applications, and developers have written several other applications from scratch. The forked applications have new names, most of them from Spanish.

Development 

MATE fully supports the GTK 3 application framework. The project is supported by Ubuntu MATE lead developer Martin Wimpress and by the Linux Mint development team: 

New features have been added to Caja such as undo/redo and diff viewing for file replacements. MATE 1.6 removes some deprecated libraries, moving from mate-conf (a fork of GConf) to GSettings, and from mate-corba (a fork of GNOME's Bonobo) to D-Bus.

One of the aims of the MATE developers is to provide a traditional user experience while using the newest technologies. In MATE 1.20, which was released in February 2018, support for HiDPI was added and the GTK+ version got increased to 3.22. The MATE 1.22 release migrated many programs from Python 2 to Python 3 and from dbus-glib to GDBus. In an upcoming version, support for Wayland will be added.

Release history 

Note that there are an odd number of versions between each official release. They are treated as versions under development, and are not announced as official releases.

Adoption 
The MATE website (as of 8 September 2022) lists 27 Linux distributions and 5 Unix-like operating systems that support the MATE desktop environment. The website also provides a Distrowatch hyperlink to "query DistroWatch.com for all the distributions that support MATE."

Reception

See also 

 Budgie
 Cinnamon
 GNOME Flashback
 LXDE
 LXQt
 Xfce

References

External links 

Official wiki
MATE Desktop in OpenSourceFeed Gallery
Old Official wiki
MATE Desktop forums (now closed)

Desktop environments based on GTK
Free desktop environments
GNOME
Software forks